Salāhuddīn Rabbānī (born 10 May 1971) is an Afghan diplomat and politician who was the Minister of Foreign Affairs of Afghanistan from February 2015 to October 2019.

He was the Afghan ambassador to Turkey from 2011 to 2012. In April 2012, it was announced that he was to chair the Afghan High Peace Council in its negotiations with the Taliban.

Early life
Salahuddin Rabbani was born on 10 May 1971 in Kabul, Afghanistan. Salahuddin's father was former Afghan High Peace Council chairman and Afghan President Burhanuddin Rabbani. His father was assassinated by a suicide bomber entering his home in 2011.

He received an undergraduate degree in management and marketing from the King Fahd University of Petroleum and Minerals in Saudi Arabia in 1995. In 2000, he received a Master's Degree in business management from Kingston University in the United Kingdom. From 2006 until 2008, he attended Columbia University’s School of International and Public Affairs (SIPA) to earn an MA in international Affairs.

Career

Private business and diplomacy
In the 1990s he worked in the financial accounting department of Saudi Aramco, and in 1996 he moved to the United Arab Emirates to work in the private sector. After 2000 he joined Afghan Ministry of Foreign Affairs. In that role, he served as the political counselor in New York to the Permanent Mission of Afghanistan to the United Nation. HE worked on issues relating to the UN Security Council, and also was the representation of Afghanistan at the First Committee of the United Nations’ General Assembly on Disarmament and International Security.

Around 2008, he moved from the United States to Afghanistan to serve as a political advisor to his father.

Ambassador to Turkey
In 2010, Afghanistan appointed him their ambassador to Turkey, and he was Ambassador to Turkey from 2011 to 2012. He was selected as leader of the Jamiat-e Islami political party after the assassination of his father on 20 September 2011. He was ambassador from 1 January 2011 until 14 April 2012.

Afghan High Peace Council
After he was appointed to the role in March 2012, in April 2012, it was announced that he was to chair the Afghan High Peace Council in its negotiations with the Taliban. He was chairman from 15 April 2012 until 1 February 2015.

Foreign minister of Afghanistan
On 12 January 2015, he was nominated by President Ashraf Ghani as Minister of Foreign Affairs, replacing Ahmad Moqbel Zarar. He was confirmed by the Afghan Parliament on 28 January and was sworn in on 1 February. On 21 March 2017, he spoke at a meeting organised by the Atlantic Council think-tank in Washington, D.C.

Rabbani resigned on 23 October 2019, accusing Ghani of sidelining him and creating parallel structures that impeded the functioning of legitimate government institutions. Ghani appointed Idrees Zaman as the acting foreign minister to replace Rabbani on 30 October.

See also

Ministry of Foreign Affairs (Afghanistan)

References

External links

Official Twitter

Foreign ministers of Afghanistan
1971 births
Living people
Ambassadors of Afghanistan to Turkey
Afghan Tajik people
Children of national leaders
School of International and Public Affairs, Columbia University alumni
2010s in Afghanistan
21st-century Afghan politicians